Milecastle 28 (Walwick) was a milecastle of the Roman Hadrian's Wall in England.  No remains are currently visible.  Its location is immediately to the south of the B6318 Military Road in Walwick.

Construction 
Milecastle 28 was probably a long-axis milecastle, though the gateway type cannot be identified.  Such milecastles were thought to have been constructed by the legio VI Victrix who were based in Eboracum (York), or by the legio XX Valeria Victrix who were based in Deva Victrix (Chester).

Excavations and investigations

1957 – The Handbook to the Roman Wall 11th edition is published, noting the presence of a platform located just before reaching Walwick Hall from Chesters, where the road swings to the left, off the line of the Wall, just west of the farm track leaving the road to the south.  The platform suggests a long-axis milecastle.

1967 – English Heritage Field Investigation.  It was noted that the milecastle could not be positively identified, but a slight scarp at may have represented its South side. It was surveyed at 1:2500.
1989 – English Heritage Field Investigation.  It was noted that there was no evidence for the milecastle at the Ordnance Survey siting symbol; the scarp at  seen by the English Heritage Field Investigator in 1969 looked early modern and also too far south of the Wall. It was concluded that the milecastle could not be located precisely, but from measurements must have been situated in the general area of NY 903 705.

Associated turrets 
Each milecastle on Hadrian's Wall had two associated turret structures.  These turrets were positioned approximately one-third and two-thirds of a Roman mile to the west of the Milecastle, and would probably have been manned by part of the milecastle's garrison.  The turrets associated with Milecastle 28 are known as Turret 28A and Turret 28B.

Turret 28A
There are currently no visible remains of Turret 28A.

Location on Ordnance Survey 1:25 000 map:

Turret 28B
Turret 28B is located the normal distance between Turret 28A and Milecastle 29.  The site (identified by English heritage Field Investigation in 1965) is marked by slight traces of protruding stonework. The stones were barely discernible, but appeared to outline a structure measuring approximately  North-South, and  East-West.

Location on Ordnance Survey 1:25 000 map:

Monument records

Public access
The sites of Milecastle 28 and Turret 28A are not publicly accessible.  The site of Turret 28B lies just off the Hadrian's Wall National Trail.

References

Bibliography

28